This Godless Endeavor is the sixth studio album by American heavy metal band Nevermore, released on July 26, 2005. The album was produced by Andy Sneap and is distributed by Century Media Records.

Overview
Guitarist Jeff Loomis revealed in an interview that This Godless Endeavor is not a concept album but a "topic-to-topic" album, with all the songs dealing with "real life issues"  that can "allegorically refer to the loss of identity, the system that we roove in, the meaning of life, the denouncement of God as a solution to all the problems that are caused by the conflicts that all the religions have initiated in various parts of the world. It's basically about human beings."

One might note that the track "A Future Uncertain" has very similar lyrics and main riff to the track "World Unborn" from their 1992 demos.

In the middle of the song "Sentient 6" there is a message played backwards that says "I am the bringer of the end, fear me, I am the beast that is technology." "Sentient 6" refers to a robot or an android that has been programmed to annihilate humankind, but actually envies humanity for their possession of emotion and a soul. The content is paradoxical and written from the perspective of the machine. The song also picks up lyrically where "The Learning" left off in The Politics of Ecstasy. In addition, it seems to have many parallels with the story of V'ger from Star Trek: The Motion Picture.

The music video for "Born" premiered on the January 27, 2006 edition of Headbangers Ball. It was shot by acclaimed director Derek Dale, resulting in what the band considers "a thought-provoking conceptual piece."

Reception

This Godless Endeavor ranked at number 2 in Unrestrained! magazine's top 20 albums of 2005.  It was also ranked #88 on the October 2006 issue of Guitar World magazine's list of the greatest 100 guitar albums of all time.

AllMusic's Eduardo Rivadavia praised "the soaring vocals of Warrel Dane and lead guitar heroics of Jeff Loomis" as "twin beacons shining out from the band's gloriously metallic bulk." He declared, "Don't forget the near-nine-minute title track, which culminates in what must surely stand as one of Nevermore's most consistent LP's in suitably epic fashion. Indeed, American-bred heavy metal doesn't get any better than this."

The album's review via PopMatters noted the complex influences as "traces of '80s progressive metal greats such as Queensrÿche, Savatage, and Fates Warning" as well as "monstrous doses of European elements, such as blazingly fast tempos, tautly performed arrangements, and unrelenting blastbeats." In one of PopMatters' only complaints, the song "Bittersweet Feast" was considered "one track too many on an otherwise extraordinary album." Overall, within Nevermore's catalog, This Godless Endeavor was touted as "yet another chapter in what has become one of the more impressive album streaks in recent metal history."

The German Rock Hard voted it "Album of the Month" and called it "the best and most intense metal album of the decade". The album was later ranked number 256 in their book The 500 Greatest Rock & Metal Albums of All Time.

Track listing

In popular culture
In the Marvel comic Runaways, the character Chase Stein mentions the track "The Psalm of Lydia" to a co-worker as a flirt while at his job at a radio station.

Personnel

Nevermore:
Warrel Dane – lead vocals
Jeff Loomis – guitar
Steve Smyth – guitar
Jim Sheppard – bass
Van Williams – drums

Guest musician:
James Murphy – special guest lead guitar on "The Holocaust of Thought"

Production:
Andy Sneap – production, engineering, mixing, mastering
Hugh Syme – cover art
Olle Carlsson – photography
Stefan Wibbeke – layout and booklet design

Chart positions

External links
Nevermore's official website
Interview with Jeff Loomis
An interview with Nevermore at Blistering magazine

References

2005 albums
Nevermore albums
Century Media Records albums
Albums produced by Andy Sneap